Tributylphosphine is the organophosphorus compound with the formula P(CH). Abbreviated or PBu, it is a tertiary phosphine. It is an oily liquid at room temperature, with a nauseating odor. It reacts slowly with atmospheric oxygen, and rapidly with other oxidizing agents, to give the corresponding phosphine oxide.  It is usually handled using air-free techniques.

Preparation 
Tributylphosphine is prepared industrially by the hydrophosphination of phosphine with butene: the addition proceeds by a free radical mechanism, and so the Markovnikov rule is not followed.
PH + 3CH=CHCHCH → P(CHCHCHCH)
Tributylphosphine can be prepared in the laboratory by reaction of the appropriate Grignard reagent with phosphorus trichloride although, as it is commercially available at reasonable prices, it is rare to have to perform the small-scale preparation.
3 BuMgCl + PCl → PBu + 3 MgCl

Reactions
Tributylphosphine reacts with oxygen to give the phosphine oxide:
2 PBu3 + O2 → 2 OPBu3
Because this reaction is so fast, the compound is usually handled under an inert atmosphere.

The phosphine is also easily alkylated. For example, benzyl chloride gives the phosphonium salt:
 PBu3 + PhCH2Cl → [PhCH2PBu3]Cl

Tributylphosphine is a common ligand for the preparation of complexes of transition metals in low oxidation states. It is cheaper and less air-sensitive than trimethylphosphine and other trialkylphosphines. Although its complexes are generally highly soluble, they are often more difficult to crystallize compared to complexes of more rigid phosphines. Furthermore, the 1H NMR properties are less easily interpreted and can mask signals for other ligands. Compared to other tertiary phosphines, it is compact (cone angle: 136°) and basic (χ-parameter: 5.25 cm−1)

Use 
Tributylphosphine finds some industrial use as a catalyst modifier in the cobalt-catalyzed hydroformylation of alkenes, where it greatly increases the ratio of straight-chain aldehydes to branched-chain aldehydes in the product mixture. However, tricyclohexylphosphine is even more effective for this purpose (although more expensive) and, in any case, rhodium catalysts are usually preferred to cobalt catalysts for the hydroformylation of alkenes.

It is the precursor to the pesticide 2,4-dichlorobenzyltributylphosphoniumchloride ("Phosfleur").

Although tributylphosphine is generally regarded as toxic, its biological effects can be manipulated by drug delivery strategies. For example, a photoactivatable version of tributylphosphine has been used to induce disulfide bond cleavage and reductive stress in living cells.

Odor
The main laboratory inconvenience of tributylphosphine is its unpleasant smell.

Hazards 
Tributylphosphine is moderately toxic, with an LD50 of 750 mg/kg (oral, rats).

References

External links 
NMR data for tributylphosphine
Material Safety Data Sheet
Use of tributyl phosphine for the reduction of disulfide bonds in proteins

Tertiary phosphines
Butyl compounds